The World Spider Catalog (WSC) is an online searchable database concerned with spider taxonomy. It aims to list all accepted families, genera and species, as well as provide access to the related taxonomic literature. The WSC began as a series of individual web pages in 2000, created by Norman I. Platnick of the American Museum of Natural History. After Platnick's retirement in 2014, the Natural History Museum of Bern (Switzerland) took over the catalog, converting it to a relational database.

, 50,151 accepted species were listed.

The order Araneae (spiders) has the seventh-most species of all orders. The existence of the World Spider Catalog makes spiders the largest taxon with an online listing that is updated regularly. It has been described as an "exhaustive resource" that has "promoted rigorous scholarship and amplified productivity" in the taxonomy of spiders.

References

External links

 Archive of previous versions

Databases in Switzerland
Online taxonomy databases
Spiders
Arachnology